Colonel Sir Alexander Don, 5th Baronet of Newton Don (died 1815) was a Scottish soldier who served as a British Army officer during the French Revolutionary Wars.

Biography
Alexander was the son of Sir Alexander Don, 4th Baronet of Newton Don, and Mary, daughter of John Murray of Philiphaugh.

Alexander succeeded to the title of 5th Baronet on 2 October 1776. In 1778 Sir Alexander was promoted to the rank of captain in the Southern Fencibles. On 21 April 1795 he was commissioned to Colonel of the newly formed Berwickshire Regiment (a fencibles cavalry regiment).  He died on 5 June 1815.

Family
In 1778 Sir Alexander married Lady Henrietta Cuninghame, daughter of Major-General William Cunningham, 13th Earl of Glencairn and Elizabeth Maguire. They had some children:
Elizabeth (died 12 June 1795)
Mary (died 12 June 1795)
Alexander (1779–1826), his heir and the 6th baronet.

Notes

References
.

1815 deaths
19th-century Scottish people
People from the Scottish Borders
British Fencibles officers
British Army personnel of the French Revolutionary Wars
Baronets in the Baronetage of Nova Scotia
Scottish soldiers
Year of birth missing